Reid Carruthers (born December 30, 1984) is a Canadian curler from Winnipeg, Manitoba. Carruthers was the 2011 world champion—winning gold as a second on Jeff Stoughton's team—as well as a six-time provincial champion, the 2003 junior provincial champion, and the 2008 Manitoba provincial mixed champion. Carruthers currently skips a Winnipeg-based rink on the World Curling Tour. He also coaches the Kerri Einarson women's team.

Career
As a junior curler, Carruthers skipped Manitoba at the 2003 Canadian Junior Curling Championships. He would lead the team to a 4-8 round robin record.

After juniors, he skipped a team with Jason Gunnlaugson, Derek Samagalski and Tyler Forrest to a provincial final against Jeff Stoughton in 2006. In 2008, he would play in his first Brier, playing as the alternate for the Kerry Burtnyk rink, finishing in 5th place.

Carruthers would join the Stoughton rink as his second, in 2010. He won his first Manitoba provincial title playing for Stoughton at the 2011 Safeway Championship. Carruthers went on to win his first Tim Hortons Brier at the 2011 event in London. The Stoughton team defeated the Glenn Howard team 8 - 6 in the final. The team went on to represent Canada at the 2011 Ford World Men's Curling Championship, which they would eventually win after only losing one game throughout the competition. Carruthers would win two more provincial championships with Stoughton, in 2013 (making the Brier final that year but losing to Brad Jacobs) and 2014 (finishing third at the Brier).

In 2014, the Stoughton rink went its separate ways, with Jeff soon retiring, and Carruthers would form his own team with Braeden Moskowy, Derek Samagalski and Colin Hodgson. The team would go on to win the 2015 Safeway Championship, earning the right to represent Manitoba at the 2015 Tim Hortons Brier. At the Brier, Carruthers led his team to a disappointing 4-7 finish.

Gaining confidence as a top skip after his 2015 Brier appearance, and his years of success as a very young front end player for Stoughton, Reid would have an excellent Grand Slam season in 2015-2016 reaching 3 finals, reaching the quarters or better in 6 of 7 Grand Slam events, and winning his first Grand Slam event at the Champions Cup by defeating John Epping of Ontario in the final.   He would however be unable to defend his Manitoba title in 2016, losing in the semi finals.  In 2017 he would advance to the final by defeating arch Manitoba rival Mike McEwen in the 1–2, but in a finals rematch would lose 8–7, losing out on a return to the Brier.  That season, he had another strong season, with a final, semi final, and quarter final in his first 4 Grand Slam events of the year. That season Carruthers would also win the 2016 Canada Cup of Curling.

Carruthers played in the 2017 Canadian Olympic Curling Trials, leading his team to a 4–4 record, missing the playoffs. Carruthers would finally win another Manitoba championship in 2018, defeating a chicken-pox ridden Mike McEwen in the final. At the 2018 Tim Hortons Brier, the team missed the playoffs, going 5–6. After the Brier, Moskowy left the team and was replaced by spares for the remainder of the season. In March 2018, it was announced McEwen would be joining the rink for the 2018-19 curling season, and will throw last rocks with Carruthers throwing third and skipping.

With McEwen joining the team, they found quick success finishing runner-up at the 2018 Elite 10 (September) to Brad Gushue. That would be the only Slam they would qualify in, missing the playoffs at the other six events. They also missed the playoffs at the 2018 Canada Cup, going 0–6. They had a better tour season, winning the Stu Sells Toronto Tankard, Karuizawa International and the Ed Werenich Golden Wrench Classic. They also were successful at the 2019 Viterra Championship, defeating William Lyburn in the final. At the 2019 Tim Hortons Brier, Team Carruthers led Manitoba to a 6–5 record, just missing the playoffs. McEwen was officially named the teams skip for the 2019–20 season.

Team McEwen had a more successful following season. On the tour, they never missed the playoffs and they won one event, the inaugural WCT Uiseong International Curling Cup. In Grand Slam play, they reached the quarterfinals of the Tour Challenge and the National and the semifinals of the Canadian Open. They would not defend their provincial title, losing the final of the 2020 Viterra Championship to Jason Gunnlaugson. They would still compete at the 2020 Tim Hortons Brier though, winning the Wild Card spot over Glenn Howard in the play-in game. Team McEwen finished the round robin and championship pool with a 7–4 record, which was a four-way tie for fourth. They faced John Epping in the first round of tiebreakers where they lost 8–5 and were eliminated. It would be the team's last event of the season as both the Players' Championship and the Champions Cup Grand Slam events were cancelled due to the COVID-19 pandemic.

In their lone tour event of the 2020–21 season, Team McEwen won the 2020 Ashley HomeStore Curling Classic. Due to the COVID-19 pandemic in Manitoba, the 2021 provincial championship was cancelled. As the reigning provincials champions, Team Jason Gunnlaugson was chosen to represent Manitoba at the 2021 Tim Hortons Brier. However, due to many provinces cancelling their provincial championships due to the COVID-19 pandemic in Canada, Curling Canada added three Wild Card teams to the national championship, which were based on the CTRS standings from the 2019–20 season. Because Team McEwen ranked 5th on the CTRS and kept at least three of their four players together for the 2020–21 season, they got the first Wild Card spot at the 2021 Brier in Calgary, Alberta. At the Brier, they finished with a 4–4 record, missing the championship pool.

Personal life
Carruthers was born in Winnipeg, Manitoba. There, he attended Glenlawn Collegiate, the University of Winnipeg, and Red River College, studying kinesiology and industrial arts.

He works as a substitute teacher with the Louis Riel School Division. He is married and has one child.

Grand Slam record

Teams

References

External links

 Canadian Curling Association Male Athlete of the Week

1984 births
Living people
Curlers from Winnipeg
World curling champions
Canadian schoolteachers
Brier champions
Canadian mixed doubles curling champions
Canadian male curlers
Continental Cup of Curling participants
Canada Cup (curling) participants
People from St. Vital, Winnipeg
Canadian curling coaches